Marten "Martin" Zijlstra (22 July 1944 – 10 December 2014) was a Dutch politician. He started his political career as member of the States of Groningen, serving between 1974 and 1978. Starting in 1977 he served as Mayor of Termunten for thirteen years. He was a member of the House of Representatives of the Netherlands between 1989 and 2002 for the Labour Party and focused on interior affairs and defence policy. After his time as Representative he served two stints as acting mayor in Oldambt and Schiermonnikoog.

Career
Zijlstra was born in Eenrum. He received his primary and secondary education in the village and then studied further at the Hogere Burgerschool in the city of Groningen. He served as non-commissioned officer at the Meteorological Service of the Royal Netherlands Air Force between 1961 and 1968.  After his time with the armed forces he studied Dutch law at the University of Groningen between 1969 and 1977. While he was studying he worked at Akzo Zout Chemie between 1968 and 1973. Afterwards he worked four years at the municipality of Delfzijl.

Zijlstra started his political career as member of the States of Groningen and was elected for one four-year term in 1974. During his time in office he became mayor of Termunten in 1977, a position which he would hold for thirteen years, until the municipality merged in 1990. In the 1989 general elections he was elected to the House of Representatives for the Labour Party. During his time as Representative he dealt mostly with interior affairs and defence policy, focusing on employment and veteran affairs. He served until 23 May 2002. In the same year he left the House of Representatives he served for one month in the municipal council of Delfzijl.

In 2010 he was acting mayor of Oldambt for some months after the municipality had been merged. And in 2011–2012 he served several months as mayor of Schiermonnikoog after the previous mayor stepped down.

Apart from his political career he also served in numerous boards of foundations and groups, including broadcaster RTV Noord for six years. He was characterized as a real inhabitant of the province of Groningen.

He was invested as a Knight of the Order of Orange-Nassau on 22 May 2002.

He died on 10 December 2014 in Woldendorp after a long illness.

References

External links
  Parlement.com biography

1944 births
2014 deaths
Dutch veterans' rights activists
Knights of the Order of Orange-Nassau
Labour Party (Netherlands) politicians
Mayors in Groningen (province)
Mayors of Schiermonnikoog
Members of the House of Representatives (Netherlands)
Members of the Provincial Council of Groningen
Municipal councillors in Groningen (province)
People from De Marne
Royal Netherlands Air Force personnel
University of Groningen alumni